Versailles is a 2014 play by the Welsh playwright Peter Gill. It deals with the aftermath of World War I and the Treaty of Versailles, marking the centenary of the war's outbreak.

The premiere production was at the Donmar Warehouse from 20 February to 5 April 2014, directed by the playwright himself and with a cast including Gwilym Lee, Helen Bradbury, Barbara Flynn, Tom Hughes, Tamla Kari, Josh O'Connor, Simon Williams and Eleanor Yates.

External links
Official website

References

2014 plays
British plays
Plays about World War I
Centenary of the outbreak of World War I